Zulia Inés Calatayud Torres (born November 9, 1979, in Havana) is a Cuban runner competing mostly in the 800 metres event.

Early career
Calatayud, who attended Havana's Manuel Permuy Sports School, got involved in athletics to help her deal with her asthma. She first gained prominence by reaching the semi-finals of the 400m at the 1998 World Junior Championships in Annecy, France. In 1999, she ran 2:00.67 to finish second at the Pan American Games in Winnipeg, Canada. She finished sixth in the 800m at the Olympic Games in Sydney, Australia. 2000 was also notable to Calatayud because she went under the 2-minute barrier, first doing so when she ran 1:59.63 in Jena, Germany.

In 2002, Calatayud became the 30th-fastest woman ever in her event, running 1:56.09 at the Herculis Golden League meeting, in Monaco. It was to be her last competition for 19 months, as dual shin injuries kept the 22-year-old from even being able to train. She made a successful return to competition, not only qualifying for the Olympic Games in Athens, Greece, but making her second consecutive Olympics final, finishing eighth.

World domination

A consistent 2005 season prefaces Calatayud's participation in the IAAF World Championships, in Helsinki. She ran a season's best 1:57.92 in her semi-final, her second fastest ever, and In the final matched every move made by Mutola and world leader, Tatyana Andrianova. In 1:58.82, Zulia Calatayud had become a World Champion. She ended the 2005 season with a convincing victory at the World Athletics Final in Monaco. The winning streak landed her atop the IAAF World Rankings, replacing Mutola who had led since the rankings were introduced in 2001.

For the 2006 season, Calatayud picked up where she left off a few months prior. She clocked her second fastest time ever (1:56.91) when placing third at the Athletissima meeting, in Lausanne, in July. She claimed the 800m crown at the 20th Central American and Caribbean Games, in Cartagena, Colombia, but after 51 consecutive weeks, she lost the No.1 spot in the rankings to Kenya's African and Commonwealth champion Janeth Jepkosgei. Nonetheless, Calatayud ended 2006 on a high note, winning the World Athletics Final and World Cup on consecutive weekends, beating rival Jepkosgei on both occasions. She was selected as Cuban and Latin American sportswoman of the year in an annual survey conducted by Prensa Latina. A total of 115 media outlets from Latin America, the Caribbean, Asia, Africa, Europe and the United States participated in the survey.

Injury again

In 2007, Calatayud was injured again, this time her season did not get underway until June, but after six weeks of training, she took a bronze medal at the Pan American Games in Rio de Janeiro. She also ran the third leg as the Cuban team won the 4 × 400 m relay gold with Daimi Pernia, Aymée Martínez and Indira Terrero. Since 2006, Calatayud has not made a major world final, falling in the semifinals at the World World Championships in Osaka 2007 and Berlin 2009, as well as the Olympic Games in Beijing in 2008. In 2009, Calatayud won the 800 at the 22nd Central American and Caribbean Athletics Championships in Havana, Cuba, in the Estadio Panamericano.

Personal bests
200 Metres - 24.33 01/01/1998
400 metres 50.87 (Alcalá de Henares 30/06/2001)
800 metres - 1:56.09 (Monaco 19/07/2002)
1000 Metres - 2:34.31 (Bruxelles 30/08/2002)
1500 Metres - 4:21.73 (La Habana 23/03/2006)

Achievements

800m progression

References

External links
 
 
 
 Tilastopaja biography
 EcuRed biography 

1979 births
Living people
Cuban female middle-distance runners
Athletes (track and field) at the 2000 Summer Olympics
Athletes (track and field) at the 2004 Summer Olympics
Athletes (track and field) at the 2008 Summer Olympics
Athletes (track and field) at the 1999 Pan American Games
Athletes (track and field) at the 2007 Pan American Games
Olympic athletes of Cuba
Athletes from Havana
Pan American Games gold medalists for Cuba
Pan American Games silver medalists for Cuba
Pan American Games bronze medalists for Cuba
Pan American Games medalists in athletics (track and field)
World Athletics Championships medalists
Goodwill Games medalists in athletics
Competitors at the 2006 Central American and Caribbean Games
World Athletics Championships athletes for Cuba
Central American and Caribbean Games gold medalists for Cuba
Central American and Caribbean Games bronze medalists for Cuba
World Athletics Championships winners
Central American and Caribbean Games medalists in athletics
Competitors at the 2001 Goodwill Games
Medalists at the 1999 Pan American Games
Medalists at the 2007 Pan American Games